Pleasant Valley is an unincorporated community in Josephine County, Oregon, United States. It is located about eleven miles north of Grants Pass, just west of Interstate 5. The community, which is located along the route of the Applegate Trail, is the site of a pioneer cemetery, and at one time it had a school.

References

Unincorporated communities in Josephine County, Oregon
Unincorporated communities in Oregon